Rudolph Matas Leopold (July 27, 1905 – September 3, 1965) was a Major League Baseball pitcher who played for the Chicago White Sox in .

External links

1905 births
1965 deaths
Chicago White Sox players
Major League Baseball pitchers
Baseball players from Louisiana